Martha Catharina Annie Vonk-van Kalker (23 September 1943 – 11 March 2022) was a Dutch politician. A member of the Labour Party, she served in the Senate from 1977 to 1981. She died in Zoetermeer on 11 March 2022, at the age of 78.

References

1943 births
2022 deaths
20th-century Dutch politicians
20th-century Dutch women politicians
Labour Party (Netherlands) politicians
Members of the Senate (Netherlands)
Politicians from Groningen (city)